Radomilov  is a village in Šumperk District in the Olomouc Region of the Czech Republic. The village is administered by Ruda nad Moravou council. The oldest note about the village comes from 1371. The Radomilov manor was held by the House of Zierotin to 1561, by the House of Fylčan z Hrabové to 1583, by the House of Odkolek z Oujezdce to 1622, and by the House of Liechtenstein to the fall of feudal system in 1848.
In 1871, an elementary school was opened, operating until 1976. Radomilov was a Czech village with only one Sudeten German inhabitant in 1930. The population was 101 people in 2011. The area is not served by public transport.

References

Villages in Šumperk District
Neighbourhoods in the Czech Republic